László Mahó (10 March 1941 – 3 June 2006) was a Hungarian cyclist. He competed in the individual road race and team time trial events at the 1964 Summer Olympics. He won the Tour de Hongrie in 1965.

References

External links
 

1941 births
2006 deaths
Hungarian male cyclists
Olympic cyclists of Hungary
Cyclists at the 1964 Summer Olympics
Cyclists from Budapest